A constitutional referendum was held in Cambodia on 30 April 1972. The changes were approved by 97.5% of voters.

Results

References

Referendums in Cambodia
1972 in Cambodia
1972 referendums
Constitutional referendums